Les Pieux is a commune in the Manche department in Normandy in north-western France. It is the head commune of the Canton of Les Pieux, and of the former communes community of les Pieux.

Les Pieux is also twinned with Lytchett Matravers.

See also
Communes of the Manche department

References

Pieux